Kyuragigawa Choseichi dam is a concrete gravity dam located in Saga Prefecture in Japan. The dam is used for power production. The catchment area of the dam is 20.9 km2. The dam impounds about 1  ha of land when full and can store 84 thousand cubic meters of water. The construction of the dam was started on 1918 and completed in 1930.

References

Dams in Saga Prefecture
1930 establishments in Japan